The following highways are numbered 587:

United States